Heathfield may refer to:

Places

Australia
 Heathfield, South Australia
 Heathfield railway station, Adelaide

South Africa
Heathfield, Cape Town, a suburb

England
 Heathfield, Cambridgeshire
 Heathfield, Croydon, London
 Heathfield, Devon, industrial estate near Bovey Tracey
 Heathfield, East Sussex
 Heathfield Park, country house
 Heathfield and Waldron, civil parish
 Heathfield (Sussex) railway station
 Heathfield transmitting station
 Heathfield, North Yorkshire
 Heathfield, Somerset
 Heathfield, Twickenham, London
Crowcombe Heathfield, Somerset
 Crowcombe Heathfield railway station

Scotland
 Heathfield, South Ayrshire, Scotland
RAF Heathfield

People
 Heathfield (surname), family name of British origin
 Baron Heathfield, British title, created in 1787
 George Augustus Eliott, 1st Baron Heathfield (1717–1790), British commander during the Great Siege of Gibraltar

Schools
 Heathfield Community College
 Heathfield Community School
Heathfield Hall, former house in Handsworth, Staffordshire
 Heathfield International School
 Heathfield School, Ascot
 Heathfield School, Pinner
 Heathfield Knoll School, Wolverley
 Heathfield Senior High School, Gateshead